The St. John's Lutheran College-Baden Hall is a historic three-story building on the east side of the campus of the former St. John's College, at Seventh Ave. and College St. in Winfield, Kansas.  It is the original building of the college and was built during 1893–94. The building was added to the National Register of Historic Places in 2011.

It was designed by architect Charles F. May.

See also 

 Mundinger Hall

 Rehwinkel Hall

References

Buildings and structures in Cowley County, Kansas
University and college buildings on the National Register of Historic Places in Kansas
Residential buildings on the National Register of Historic Places in Kansas
University and college dormitories in the United States
National Register of Historic Places in Cowley County, Kansas